Manuilovskaya is a rural locality (a village) in Yuchkinskoye Rural Settlement, Vozhegodsky District, Vologda Oblast, Russia. The population was 1 as of 2002.

Geography 
Manuilovskaya is located 29 km east of Vozhega (the district's administrative centre) by road. Ivanovskaya is the nearest rural locality.

References 

Rural localities in Vozhegodsky District